The Saint-Hyacinthe Laser were a junior ice hockey team in the Quebec Major Junior Hockey League from 1989 to 1996. They played their home games at Stade L.P. Gaucher in Saint-Hyacinthe, Quebec, Canada.

History
The Saint-Hyacinthe Laser were born in 1989 after the Verdun Junior Canadiens were bought and moved to the city of Saint-Hyacinthe, Quebec. The team played for seven years before moving to Rouyn-Noranda.

In the third year of operation, general manager Claude Lemieux was named Executive of the Year (John Horman Trophy). He rebuilt the Verdun Junior Canadiens team that struggled in last place in the QMJHL for three seasons into a club with a winning record, and was awarded for many individual achievements in the next few years. Richard Martel was awarded Coach of the Year in 1993-94 (Ron Lapointe Trophy). His assistant coach that season was Mario Pouliot.

Players
The most notable player in the team's history is goaltender Martin Brodeur. He played three full seasons with the Laser, being drafted 20th overall in the 1st round of the 1990 NHL Entry Draft.

Award winners

CHL Player of the Year
 1991-92 Charles Poulin

CHL Sportsman of the Year
 1991-92 Martin Gendron

CHL Humanitarian of the Year
 1994-95 David-Alexandre Beauregard

Jean Béliveau Trophy(Top Scorer)
 1991-92 Patrick Poulin

Michel Brière Commemorative Trophy(Most valuable player)
 1991-92 Charles Poulin

Shell Cup – Offensive(Offensive player of the year)
 1991-92 Martin Gendron

Raymond Lagacé Trophy(Offensive Rookie of the Year)
 1993-94 Jimmy Drolet

Frank J. Selke Memorial Trophy(Most sportsmanlike player)
 1991-92 Martin Gendron
 1992-93 Martin Gendron

Paul Dumont Trophy(Personality of the year)
 1991-92 Patrick Poulin

Wittnauer Plaque(Best community involvement)
 1994-95 David-Alexandre Beauregard

NHL alumni

Season-by-season results

Regular season

Playoffs
1989-1990 Defeated Trois-Rivières Draveurs 4 games to 3 in quarter-finals. Lost to Victoriaville Tigres 4 games to 1 in semi-finals.
1990-1991 Lost to Longueuil Collège Français 4 games to 0 in quarter-finals.
1991-1992 Lost to Verdun Collège Français 4 games to 2 in quarter-finals.
1992-1993 Out of playoffs.
1993-1994 Lost to Hull Olympiques 4 games to 3 in division quarter-finals.
1994-1995 Lost to Hull Olympiques 4 games to 1 in division quarter-finals.
1995-1996 Finished 4th place (3 wins, 4 losses) in 6 team round-robin for division quarter-finals. Lost to Granby Prédateurs 4 games to 1 in quarter-finals.

References

Defunct Quebec Major Junior Hockey League teams
Sport in Saint-Hyacinthe
Ice hockey clubs established in 1989
Ice hockey clubs disestablished in 1996
1989 establishments in Quebec
1996 disestablishments in Quebec